Yuri Santos Tavares Carloia (born on 11 August 1995), known professionally as Yuman, is an Italian singer-songwriter.

Biography 
Born in Rome to a Cape Verdean father and an Italian mother, Yuman was raised around Valle Aurelia, a metropolitan district of Rome. During his first musical studies he decided to undertake a series of trips between London and Berlin, which allowed him to broaden his horizons.

His music career began in 2016, with the meeting of record producer Francesco Cataldo who offered him a recording contract with the label Leave Music. In 2018 Cataldo produced Yuman's debut single "Twelwe", which was on rotation on mainstream Italian radio.

In 2019 he obtained a recording contract with the label Universal Music Italia, with whom he released his debut studio album "Naked Thoughts", which was anticipated by the single "Run".

Yuman placed first during the show, with his entry "Mille notti", by rightfully accessing the festival in the  category. "Ora e qui" was later announced as his entry for the Sanremo Music Festival 2022.

Discography

Studio albums 
 Naked Thoughts (2019)
 Qui (2022)

Singles 
 "Twelve" (2018)
 "Run" (2019)
 "Somebody to Love" (2019)
 "I Will" (2019)
 "I Am" (2021)
 "Mille notti" (2021)
 "Ora e qui" (2022)

References

Italian singer-songwriters
Living people
21st-century Italian singers
1995 births
Singers from Rome